Dana John Wachs (born August 25, 1957) is an American lawyer and politician who represented the 91st District in the Wisconsin State Assembly. Wachs was a candidate for Governor of Wisconsin in 2018.

Early life and legal career 
Born in Eau Claire, Wisconsin to Lucille (a teacher) and Ray Wachs (former Eau Claire City Attorney and City Manager), Wachs graduated from Eau Claire Memorial High School, Marquette University and received his J.D. degree from Valparaiso University School of Law.

Wachs has practiced law in Eau Claire for 30 years. He has achieved the highest rating, AV, by Martindale-Hubbell for legal ability and ethical standards. He has been named a Wisconsin Super Lawyer. He has also been recognized as one of the top lawyers in Wisconsin by Milwaukee Magazine and was named to the National “Top 100 Lawyers” list by the National Trial Lawyers Organization. Wachs is a member of the Wisconsin State Bar Association, the American Association for Justice, the Wisconsin Association for Justice, the American Bar Association and the National Trial Lawyer Organization. Wachs practices at Gingras, Thomsen & Wachs in Eau Claire.

As an attorney, Wachs has negotiated $6 million, $2.9 million, and $1 million settlements in separate medical malpractice cases. He also successfully argued before the Wisconsin Supreme Court for an expansion of medical malpractice law.

Eau Claire City Council 
Wachs served as a member of the Eau Claire City Council from 2009-2012. During his time on the City Council, Wachs served on the City/County Health Committee, Transit Commission, Affirmative Action Committee, Parks and Waterway Committee, Library Board, and Economic Policy Advisory Committee.

Wisconsin State Assembly 
In November 2012, Wachs was elected unopposed to the Wisconsin State Assembly as a Democrat. He was re-elected unopposed in 2014. In 2016, Wachs was elected to serve on the Credentials Committee at the Democratic National Convention.

During his first term in the Wisconsin State Assembly, Rep. Wachs served on the Assembly Committees on Colleges and Universities, Constitution and Ethics, Criminal Justice, Judiciary, and Workforce Development. He was also the Vice-Chair of the Legislative Council Study Committee on the Transfer of Structured Settlement Payments.

In 2013, Wachs introduced Assembly Bill Assembly Bill 51, the "Revolving Door" bill. This proposal would have prohibited any former legislator from working as a lobbyist for 24 months after they leave office. In 2014, he introduced Assembly Joint Resolution 80, which would have called for a statewide advisory referendum on whether or not Wisconsin should adopt a nonpartisan system of redistricting.

For the 2015 legislative session, Rep. Wachs served as the ranking Democratic member on the Assembly Committees on Judiciary and Colleges and Universities. He also served on the Constitution and Ethics Committee.

Run for Governor 
Wachs was one of ten declared candidates for the Democratic nomination for Governor of Wisconsin in 2018, but was the second to drop out, leaving the race in June and endorsing Tony Evers for the nomination.

Personal 
Wachs has three adult children with his first wife, Tina.
He is currently married to Beverly Wickstrom.

References

External links 
Campaign Website
Representative Dana Wachs at the Wisconsin State Legislature
constituency site
 

Living people
Politicians from Eau Claire, Wisconsin
Marquette University alumni
Valparaiso University School of Law alumni
Wisconsin lawyers
Wisconsin city council members
Democratic Party members of the Wisconsin State Assembly
1957 births
21st-century American politicians